Elmar Gasanov (born 1983 in Sevastopol) is a Ukrainian pianist trained at the Moscow Conservatory representing Russia at international competitions. He later undertook postgraduate studies at London's Royal College of Music, as a student of Professor Vanessa Latarche. Gasanov graduated with the Master of Music degree with Distinction.

Gasanoz has given solo and concerto performances outside his native Russia, including appearances in Hungary (Budapest Spring Festival), Germany (Baden-Baden Summer Festival), France (Colmar Festival), Holland, Austria, the UK (Campden Music Festival), in Turkey, Brazil, USA, Slovakia, Sloveniya, Ukraine, as well as Switzerland (Zurich Tonhalle, Paul Klee Centre Berne, Crans-Montana.)

Gasanoz regularly  works with renowned orchestras and conductors, including the Musikkollegium Winterthur under Theodor Guschlbauer, Tonhalle Orchester Zurich under David Zinman, Concerto Budapest under Andras Keller, the INSO Orchestra Lviv under Georg Kugi and others, the Hong Kong Philharmonic Orchestra under Vladimir Ashkenazy.

In 2012, EMI Records released his recording of Liszt's Sonata B minor within project Digital Debut.

Competition record
 2000 - Vladimir Krainev IPC, Kharkiv: 1st prize
 2006 - Franz Liszt-Béla Bartók IPC, Budapest: 1st prize
 2010 - ISANGYUN Competition, Tongyeong: 3rd prize
 2011 - Hong Kong Piano Competition: 5th prize
 2011 - Geza Anda Piano Competition, Zurich: 3rd prize and the Schumann prize

References

Ukrainian classical pianists
Male classical pianists
Russian classical pianists
1983 births
Living people
21st-century classical pianists
21st-century Russian male musicians